Richard Tufton may refer to:

Richard Tufton, 5th Earl of Thanet (1640/41–1684), MP for Appleby, Earl of Thanet
Sir Richard Tufton, 1st Baronet (1813–1871), British baronet (see Baron Hothfield)
Richard Tufton (MP, died 1631) (1585–1631), English lawyer and politician, MP for Grantham, and for Rye